Mehram Nagar, a 17th-century village, lies north-east of IGI Terminal-1 in Delhi state of India.

History
Mehram Nagar village, Meharm Bazaar and Mehram Serai were established in 1639 by a eunuch Mehram Khan, who was incharge of mughal harem during the reign of Shah Jahan.

Archaeological Survey of India board in the village mentions several monuments, including the old darwaza (gate), mosque and serai that were built by the mughals, such as Mehram Khan (harem keeper of Jahangir), Shah Jahan and his son Aurangzeb in 1660 CE.

External links
 A November 2017 report on Mehram Nagar and Serai

See also
 Tourism in Delhi
 Delhi Sultanate
 History of Delhi
 Timeline of Delhi

References

Tourism in Delhi
Tourist attractions in Delhi
Monuments and memorials in Delhi
Ruins in India
Government buildings completed in the 17th century
Villages in South Delhi district